Ruth Ann Watson Gregory is a British mathematician and physicist, currently Head of Department of Physics and Professor of Theoretical Physics at King's College London. Her fields of specialisation are general relativity and cosmology.

Education
Gregory earned her PhD from the Department of Applied Mathematics and Theoretical Physics at Trinity College, Cambridge in 1988, writing a thesis on "topological defects in cosmology" supervised by John M. Stewart.

Career
Gregory held postdoctoral appointments at the Fermi National Accelerator Laboratory and Fermi Institute in the University of Chicago, before returning to Cambridge for a five-year research fellowship. She was appointed Professor of Mathematics and Physics at the University of Durham in 2005. Gregory held this post until her appointment as Head of Department of Physics and Professor of Theoretical Physics at King's College London in 2021.

She is a visiting fellow at the Perimeter Institute for Theoretical Physics where she lectures as part of the PSI's master's programme.

She serves as a managing editor of International Journal of Modern Physics D.

Research
Her research centres on the intersection of fundamental high energy physics and cosmology. She is best known for the Gregory–Laflamme instability, describing an instability of black strings in higher dimensions.

Awards and honours
Gregory was given the 2006 Maxwell Medal and Prize by the Institute of Physics for her contributions to physics at the interface of general relativity and string theory, in particular for her work on the physics of cosmic strings and black holes.

In 2011 she received the Royal Society Wolfson Research Merit Award to study Time and Extra Dimensions in Space.

Selected publications
.
.
.
.
.
.

References

External links
Professor Ruth Gregory – profile at The Royal Society website.

Living people
British women mathematicians
British physicists
Alumni of Trinity College, Cambridge
Academics of Durham University
20th-century British mathematicians
21st-century British mathematicians
Royal Society Wolfson Research Merit Award holders
20th-century women mathematicians
21st-century women mathematicians
Year of birth missing (living people)